Kenotic is the debut studio album by American ambient/post-rock band Hammock. It was released in March 2005 by Hammock Music. Reception of the record was generally positive, and cemented their musical reputation before their EP Stranded Under Endless Sky was released later that year. In December 2005, American webzine Somewhere Cold ranked Kenotic No. 5 on their 2005 Somewhere Cold Awards Hall of Fame list."Through a Glass Darkly", "Winter Light", and "The Silence" were all based on Ingmar Bergman movie titles. The track "You May Emerge From This More Dead Than Alive" came from the dialog of Winter Light.

On September 5, 2015, Hammock announced through their Facebook page that a deluxe remastered version of the album would be released to mark its 10-year anniversary.

Track listing

CD edition

Personnel
 Marc Byrd – guitar
 Andrew Thompson – guitar

External links
 Last.fm

References

2005 debut albums
Hammock (band) albums
Hammock Music albums